'West Ashfield' is a staff training facility for the London Underground on the third floor of Ashfield House in West Kensington. It was opened in 2010 at a cost of £800,000.

Facilities
Designed by Reyneke Designs and completed in 2009, the facility is used by TfL for training staff and is laid out exactly as a real station would be, except it is significantly shorter, the suicide pit is a painted effect and the train façade in the tunnel won't move into the station. 

The single platform is nominally a westbound platform on the District line situated between West Kensington and Earl's Court station. Staff are able to run training sessions which reflect signal points, tannoy announcements and electricity power controls. A fan in an upper corner of the room simulates the familiar blast of air when a train arrives and the platform can vibrate to simulate the rumbling of an approaching train.

There is a model railway at the West Ashfield training facility, also designed by Reyneke Designs, which is used to simulate various faults so that staff can learn how to deal with them. The five stations on the model railway are Hobbs End, Kensington Palace, West Ashfield, Strand-on-the-Green and Hammersmith Bridge.

Decommissioning
As part of the joint venture between Transport for London and the developers of the Earls Court Exhibition Centre site, the plan is to regenerate the area. This will involve shutting down the historic Lillie Bridge Depot along with Ashfield House by 2024.

References

External links
 IanVisits tour of the station
 West Ashfield Station - a simulated London Underground Station by Reyneke Designs "3D Animation created to develop and communicate the design concept, generate interest, secure funding, and form part of the tender documentation."
 West Ashfield Station Lighting Sequence Animation by Reyneke Designs "Lighting Sequence Animation created to illustrate the design intention, demonstrate timings and form part of the tender documentation."
 The Making of a Fully Signalled London Underground Model Railway by Reyneke Designs "The Model Railway forms part of the West Ashfield Station training facility on the third floor of Ashfield House in West London. It is a fully signalled LUL railway in miniature, comprising 5 stations, 3 of which are situated in controlled areas. The maximum number of trains that may be in service is 16."

London Underground
Simulation